Acria emarginella is a moth in the family Depressariidae. It was described by Edward Donovan in 1804. It is found in China (Henan, Sichuan, Tianjin, Zhejiang), Sri Lanka, India and Japan.

The wingspan is 19–23 mm.

References

Moths described in 1804
Acria
Moths of Asia